In the geometry of hyperbolic 3-space, the square tiling honeycomb is one of 11 paracompact regular honeycombs. It is called paracompact because it has infinite cells, whose vertices exist on horospheres and converge to a single ideal point at infinity. Given by Schläfli symbol {4,4,3}, it has three square tilings, {4,4}, around each edge, and six square tilings around each vertex, in a cubic {4,3} vertex figure.

Rectified order-4 square tiling 
It is also seen as a rectified order-4 square tiling honeycomb, r{4,4,4}:

Symmetry
The square tiling honeycomb has three reflective symmetry constructions:  as a regular honeycomb, a half symmetry construction  ↔ , and lastly a construction with three types (colors) of checkered square tilings  ↔ .

It also contains an index 6 subgroup [4,4,3*] ↔ [41,1,1], and a radial subgroup [4,(4,3)*] of index 48, with a right dihedral-angled octahedral fundamental domain, and four pairs of ultraparallel mirrors: .

This honeycomb contains  that tile 2-hypercycle surfaces, which are similar to the paracompact order-3 apeirogonal tiling :

Related polytopes and honeycombs 
The square tiling honeycomb is a regular hyperbolic honeycomb in 3-space. It is one of eleven regular paracompact honeycombs.

There are fifteen uniform honeycombs in the [4,4,3] Coxeter group family, including this regular form, and its dual, the order-4 octahedral honeycomb, {3,4,4}.

The square tiling honeycomb is part of the order-4 square tiling honeycomb family, as it can be seen as a rectified order-4 square tiling honeycomb.

It is related to the 24-cell, {3,4,3}, which also has a cubic vertex figure.
It is also part of a sequence of honeycombs with square tiling cells:

Rectified square tiling honeycomb 

The rectified square tiling honeycomb, t1{4,4,3},  has cube and square tiling facets, with a triangular prism vertex figure.

It is similar to the 2D hyperbolic uniform triapeirogonal tiling, r{∞,3}, with triangle and apeirogonal faces.

Truncated square tiling honeycomb 

The truncated square tiling honeycomb, t{4,4,3},  has cube and truncated square tiling facets, with a triangular pyramid vertex figure. It is the same as the cantitruncated order-4 square tiling honeycomb, tr{4,4,4}, .

Bitruncated square tiling honeycomb 

The bitruncated square tiling honeycomb, 2t{4,4,3},  has truncated cube and truncated square tiling facets, with a digonal disphenoid vertex figure.

Cantellated square tiling honeycomb 

The cantellated square tiling honeycomb, rr{4,4,3},  has cuboctahedron, square tiling, and triangular prism facets, with an isosceles triangular prism vertex figure.

Cantitruncated square tiling honeycomb 

The cantitruncated square tiling honeycomb, tr{4,4,3},  has truncated cube, truncated square tiling, and triangular prism facets, with an isosceles triangular pyramid vertex figure.

Runcinated square tiling honeycomb 

The runcinated square tiling honeycomb, t0,3{4,4,3},  has octahedron, triangular prism, cube, and square tiling facets, with an irregular triangular antiprism vertex figure.

Runcitruncated square tiling honeycomb 

The runcitruncated square tiling honeycomb, t0,1,3{4,4,3},  has rhombicuboctahedron, octagonal prism, triangular prism and truncated square tiling facets, with an isosceles-trapezoidal pyramid vertex figure.

Runcicantellated square tiling honeycomb 

The runcicantellated square tiling honeycomb is the same as the runcitruncated order-4 octahedral honeycomb.

Omnitruncated square tiling honeycomb 

The omnitruncated square tiling honeycomb, t0,1,2,3{4,4,3},  has truncated square tiling, truncated cuboctahedron, hexagonal prism, and octagonal prism facets, with an irregular tetrahedron vertex figure.

Omnisnub square tiling honeycomb 

The alternated omnitruncated square tiling honeycomb (or omnisnub square tiling honeycomb), h(t0,1,2,3{4,4,3}),  has snub square tiling, snub cube, triangular antiprism, square antiprism, and tetrahedron cells, with an irregular tetrahedron vertex figure.

Alternated square tiling honeycomb

The alternated square tiling honeycomb, h{4,4,3},  is a quasiregular paracompact uniform honeycomb in hyperbolic 3-space. It has cube and square tiling facets in a cuboctahedron vertex figure.

Cantic square tiling honeycomb

The cantic square tiling honeycomb, h2{4,4,3},  is a paracompact uniform honeycomb in hyperbolic 3-space. It has truncated square tiling, truncated cube, and cuboctahedron facets, with a rectangular pyramid vertex figure.

Runcic square tiling honeycomb

The runcic square tiling honeycomb, h3{4,4,3},  is a paracompact uniform honeycomb in hyperbolic 3-space. It has square tiling, rhombicuboctahedron, and octahedron facets in a square frustum vertex figure.

Runcicantic square tiling honeycomb

The runcicantic square tiling honeycomb, h2,3{4,4,3},  ↔ , is a paracompact uniform honeycomb in hyperbolic 3-space. It has truncated square tiling, truncated cuboctahedron, and truncated octahedron facets in a mirrored sphenoid vertex figure.

Alternated rectified square tiling honeycomb

The alternated rectified square tiling honeycomb is a paracompact uniform honeycomb in hyperbolic 3-space.

See also 
 Convex uniform honeycombs in hyperbolic space
 Regular tessellations of hyperbolic 3-space
 Paracompact uniform honeycombs

References 

Coxeter, Regular Polytopes, 3rd. ed., Dover Publications, 1973. . (Tables I and II: Regular polytopes and honeycombs, pp. 294–296)
 The Beauty of Geometry: Twelve Essays (1999), Dover Publications,  (Chapter 10, Regular Honeycombs in Hyperbolic Space) Table III
 Jeffrey R. Weeks The Shape of Space, 2nd edition  (Chapter 16-17: Geometries on Three-manifolds I,II)
 Norman Johnson Uniform Polytopes, Manuscript
 N.W. Johnson: The Theory of Uniform Polytopes and Honeycombs, Ph.D. Dissertation, University of Toronto, 1966 
 N.W. Johnson: Geometries and Transformations, (2018) Chapter 13: Hyperbolic Coxeter groups
 Norman W. Johnson and Asia Ivic Weiss Quadratic Integers and Coxeter Groups PDF Can. J. Math. Vol. 51 (6), 1999 pp. 1307–1336

Honeycombs (geometry)
Square tilings